Ingalagi may refer to:
 Ingalagi, Belgaum, a village in the Belgaum district of Karnataka, India
 Ingalagi, Kundgol, a village in Kundgol taluk of Dharwad district of Karnataka, India
 Ingalagi, Bagalkot